The Hainan mountain keelback (Trimerodytes balteatus) is a species of snake in the family Colubridae. It is found in Vietnam and China.

References 

Reptiles described in 1895
Trimerodytes
Reptiles of China
Reptiles of Vietnam
Taxa named by Edward Drinker Cope